Peppino Tirri (born December 14, 1956) is an Italian football agent registered with the football association of Italy. From 5 August 2012 he is President of the Bulgarian club POFC Botev Vratsa.

He is credited as being among the most powerful and influent football agents in the world, one of the only who transferred several Golden Balls winning stars such as Antonio Cassano, Walter Samuel Esteban Cambiasso,
, Luís Figo, Wesley Sneijder, Samuel Eto'o

He was born in Licata a small town in Sicily, famous for its football tradition having played in Serie B launched the Bohemian coach Zdeněk Zeman, in those years still a beginner. He has only one child, Luigi Tirri

Early career 

In 1992 he was appointed CEO in Licata Calcio, then Club C-2

Career as an agent 

In 2000 Tirri moved Enzo Maresca back to ItalyWest Bromwich Albion, to join the Juventus F.C., in a transfer deal worth 4.3 million Pound sterling, a club record sale for Albion.

Mendieta and Rivaldo 

In July 2001 Tirri and Ernesto Bronzetti arranged Gaizka Mendieta's from Valencia to SS Lazio (for a record $90 billion Italian lira) and in 2002 Rivaldo's transfer from Barcelona to A.C. Milan for a three-year contract for 4 million euro net per year

Florentino Perez and Real Madrid 

In 2004 Florentino Perez was re-elected as president of Real Madrid . During his presidency there were about a dozen transfers conducted by Tirri between the Spanish club and Italy, especially with Inter Milan

Season 2011

Gabriel 

In April 2011, Tirri and his son Luigi Tirri brokered the transfer of the young Brazilian talent, Gabriel, from Resende Futebol Clube to Juventus
 in a transfer deal worth 13.5 million Reais (six million Euro's plus bonus) a club record sale for almost unknown Brazilian club. At the age of 17, the player was elected "the revelation" of the Campeonato Carioca 2011

Samuel Eto'o 

During the summer of 2011 Tirri oversaw the transfer of Samuel Eto'o from Inter Milan to FC Anzhi Makhachkala. The deal made much noise in Europe for its massive worth : fee of 30 million Euro's, salary of 29 million a year (Unknown commission worth). Mining billionaire Suleyman Abusaidovich Kerimov made Cameroonian star forward the highest-paid soccer player in the world ahead of Messi, Cristiano Ronaldo and David Beckham.
Anzhi Makhachkala club is based in Kerimov boyhood home, the Russian region of Dagestan.Foreign Policy supports the hypothesis that this investment has a political purpose:"According to Jonathan Wilson at The Guardian, the London newspaper, this is all about pleasing Vladimir Putin, who has long urged Russia's oligarchs to put their wealth into the country's struggling regions. The soccer club has a long history of supporting Putin".

Kaká 

In the same summer Tirri received a mandate from Major League Soccer to bring to USA the Brazilian star Kaká, (Tirri and Bronzetti brokered Kaká's move from A.C. Milan to Real Madrid for around €70 million)

Major League Soccer's leadership has taken steps to bring international stars into the league in an effort to raise the level of play, such as David Beckham since 2007. Although their efforts, the player chose to stay with Galácticos.

References 

Italian sports agents
Living people
1956 births
Italian businesspeople
Association football agents